The French Agency for Food, Environmental and Occupational Health & Safety (ANSES) is a French government agency whose main mission is to assess health risks in food, the environment and work, with the aim of enlightening public policy-making. ANSES is accountable to the French Ministries of Health, Agriculture, the Environment, Labour and Consumer Affairs.

References

External links
 Official website

Government agencies of France
Food safety organizations
Environmental health organizations
Occupational safety and health organizations
Regulation in France